Antonio Castillo Lastrucci (February 27, 1882 - November 29, 1967) was a Spanish sculptor, focused in religious works. His works can be found in the Cathedral of St Mary of the Assumption in Ceuta, several churches of Seville, and in other parts of Spain.

References 

1882 births
1967 deaths
20th-century Spanish sculptors
20th-century Spanish male artists
Spanish male sculptors
Catholic sculptors